Kalin may refer to:

Places
 Kalin, East Azerbaijan, a village in East Azerbaijan Province, Iran
 Kalin, Qazvin, a village in Qazvin Province, Iran
 Kalin-e Khalaseh, a village in Tehran Province, Iran
 Kalin-e Sadat, a village in Tehran Province, Iran

Other uses
 Kalin Lucas (born 1989), American basketball player in the Israel Basketball Premier League
 Kalin (surname)
 Kalin (Hinduism)
 Kalin (Tamil origin name)

See also
 Kälin